L. Jay Silvester (born August 27, 1937) and participated in college athletics at Utah State University from 1956 to 1959 is an American retired athlete who mainly competed in the discus throw. In this event he finished in fourth, fifth, second and eighth place at the 1964, 1968, 1972 and 1976 Summer Olympics, respectively, and won a bronze medal at the 1975 Pan American Games.

During his career, Silvester won five AAU discus titles and set four world records, two in 1961 (60.56 m and 60.72 m) and two in 1968 (66.54 m and 68.40 m). His personal bests were 70.38 m in the discus (1971, unofficial world record) and 20.01 m in the shot put.

After retirement, he worked as professor of physical education at Brigham Young University.

Silvester held the M35 Masters American Records for the Shot Put and Discus Throw, and is the current holder of the
M70 Masters American Records for the Discus Throw.  Silvester won gold medals for the M45 Discus Throw at the 1983
and 1984 Masters National Outdoor Championships.

References

External links
 
 
 

1937 births
Living people
American male discus throwers
Olympic silver medalists for the United States in track and field
Athletes (track and field) at the 1964 Summer Olympics
Athletes (track and field) at the 1968 Summer Olympics
Athletes (track and field) at the 1972 Summer Olympics
Athletes (track and field) at the 1975 Pan American Games
Athletes (track and field) at the 1976 Summer Olympics
People from Tremonton, Utah
Track and field athletes from Utah
World record setters in athletics (track and field)
American masters athletes
Utah State University alumni
Medalists at the 1972 Summer Olympics
Pan American Games medalists in athletics (track and field)
Pan American Games bronze medalists for the United States
Medalists at the 1975 Pan American Games